The Electoral district of Evelyn and Mornington was an electoral district of the Victorian Legislative Assembly. 

The district was based on the counties of Evelyn and Mornington, and defined in the Victoria Constitution Act 1855.

Members of Evelyn and Mornington

See also
 Parliaments of the Australian states and territories
 List of members of the Victorian Legislative Assembly

References

Former electoral districts of Victoria (Australia)
1856 establishments in Australia
1859 disestablishments in Australia